Haastrup is a surname. Notable people with the surname include:

Ajimoko I, alias Frederick Kumokun Adedeji Haastrup (born ca 1820), Nigerian king
Benita Haastrup (born 1964), Danish jazz drummer
Mark Haastrup (born 1984), Danish golfer
Mogens Haastrup (born 1939), Danish footballer
Philipp Haastrup (born 1982), German footballer